The Burj Al Arab (Arab Tower) is a luxury hotel located in the city of Dubai, United Arab Emirates. Managed by Jumeirah hotel group, it is one of the tallest hotels in the world, although 39% of its total height is made up of non-occupiable space. The shape of the structure is designed to resemble the sail of a ship.

Site 
The beachfront area where Burj Al Arab and Jumeirah Beach Hotel are located was previously called Chicago Beach. The former hotel was demolished during the construction of the Burj Al Arab. The locale's name had its origins in the Chicago Bridge & Iron Company, which at one time welded giant floating oil storage tanks, known locally as Kazzans, on the site.

Design and construction 
The Burj Al Arab was designed by the multidisciplinary consultancy Atkins, led by architect Tom Wright. The design and construction were managed by Canadian engineer Rick Gregory, also of WS Atkins. Construction of the island began in 1994 and involved up to 2,000 construction workers during peak construction. It was built to resemble the billowing spinnaker sail of a J-class yacht. Two "wings" spread in a V to form a vast "mast", while the space between them is enclosed in a massive atrium.  The setting of a high rise building on saturated soil and the novelty of the project required groundbreaking dynamic analysis and design to take into consideration soil-structure interaction, effect of water, high winds, and helipad among other loads, to help finalize the design and take the project into construction.

The hotel was built by South African construction contractor Murray & Roberts, now renamed Concor and Al Habtoor Engineering. The interior designs were led and created by Khuan Chew and John Coralan of KCA international and delivered by UAE based Depa Group.

The building opened on 1 December 1999.

The hotel's helipad was designed by Irish architect Rebecca Gernon. The helipad is above the building's 59th floor, and has been used as a car race track, a boxing ring, a tennis match, and the jumping off point for the highest kite surfing jump in history.

Features 

Several features of the hotel required complex engineering feats to achieve. To secure a foundation, the builders drove 230  concrete piles into the sand by drilling method.

Engineers created a ground surface layer of large rocks, which is circled with a concrete honeycomb pattern, which serves to protect the foundation from erosion. It took three years to reclaim the land from the sea, while it took fewer than three years to construct the building itself.

The 18 storied atrium is enclosed by 12 individually tensioned two-layer membrane panels form the north facing façade.

Given the height of the building, the Burj Al Arab is the world's fifth tallest hotel after Gevora Hotel, JW Marriott Marquis Dubai, Four Seasons Place Kuala Lumpur and Rose and Rayhaan by Rotana. But where buildings with mixed use were stripped off the list, the Burj Al Arab would be the world's third tallest hotel.

Rooms and suites
The hotel is managed by the Jumeirah Group. The hotel has 199 exclusive suites each allocated eight dedicated staff members and a 24-hour butler service.

Suites feature design details that juxtapose east and west. White columns show great influence. Bathrooms are accented by mosaic tile patterns.

The Burj Al Arab is very popular with the Chinese market, which made up 25 percent of all bookings at the hotel in 2011 and 2012.

Services
The hotel provides many services including shuttle service with a variety of luxury vehicles like Rolls-Royce and Lamborghini. The hotel has golf carts that assists guests to and from the beach. The carts also carry the guests throughout the Jumeirah beach consisting of Jumeirah Beach Hotel, Jumeirah Al Naseem, Jumeirah Al Qasr and Jumeirah Souk Madinat.

The hotel also hosts many events in the ballroom called Al Falak managed by the Burj Al Arab event team. The events are high-end and employees more than 50-70 staff per event according to the size of the event. There is also an open event space called the Marina Garden where the team organises award functions, weddings, cocktail reception and many more.

The hotel has a helicopter service with a helipad on the magnificent structure of the building. Many events like Art Maze are held up on the helipad.

Restaurants

There are six restaurants in the hotel, including:

It is supported by a full cantilever that extends  from either side of the mast, and is accessed by a panoramic elevator.

Rating
The Burj Al Arab is a five-star hotel, the highest official ranking. While the hotel is sometimes erroneously described as "the world's only 'seven-star' hotel", the hotel management claims never to have done that themselves. The term appeared due to a British journalist who had visited the hotel on a tour before the hotel was officially opened. The journalist described Burj al Arab as "more than anything she has ever seen" and therefore referred to it as a seven-star hotel. In the words of a Jumeirah Group spokesperson: "There's not a lot we can do to stop it. We're not encouraging the use of the term. We've never used it in our advertising."

Reception

Reviews by architecture critics

Burj Al Arab has attracted criticism as well "a contradiction of sorts, considering how well-designed and impressive the construction ultimately proves to be." The contradiction here seems to be related to the hotel's decor. "This extraordinary investment in state-of-the-art construction technology stretches the limits of the ambitious urban imagination in an exercise that is largely due to the power of excessive wealth." Another critic includes negative critiques for the city of Dubai as well: "both the hotel and the city, after all, are monuments to the triumph of money over practicality. Both elevate style over substance." Yet another: "Emulating the quality of palatial interiors, in an expression of wealth for the mainstream, a theater of opulence is created in Burj Al Arab … The result is a baroque effect".

Notable events
These include:
2004: Tiger Woods teeing off.
2005: Andre Agassi and Roger Federer playing tennis.
2006: Ronan Keating shot the Music Video for his single "Iris" at the Helipad of Burj Al Arab.
2007: The Today Show broadcast from the Helipad a segment of Where in the World is Matt Lauer?
2011: Golfer Rory McIlroy performing a bunker shot.
2013: Heli-lift of Aston Martin Vanquish.
2013: David Coulthard performing donuts in a Formula 1 racecar.
2017: Nick Jacobsen kiteboards down to the sea.
2021: David Guetta playing a DJ set on livestream.
2023: Lukasz Czepiela landed the plane on the helipad platform, and takes off.

In popular culture 
The last chapter of the espionage novel Performance Anomalies takes place at the top of the Burj Al Arab, where the spy protagonist Cono 7Q discovers that through deadly betrayal his spy nemesis Katerina has maneuvered herself into the top echelon of the government of Kazakhstan. The hotel can also be seen in Syriana and also some Bollywood movies.

Richard Hammond included the building in his television series, Richard Hammond's Engineering Connections.

The Burj Al Arab serves as the cover image for the 2009 album Ocean Eyes by Owl City.

The Burj Al Arab was the site of the last task of the fifth episode of the first season of the Chinese edition of The Amazing Race, where teams had to clean up a room to the hotel's standards.

The building is featured in Matthew Reilly's novel The Six Sacred Stones, where a kamikaze pilot crashes a plane into the hotel, destroying it in an attempt to kill the protagonist, Jack West Jr.

The building was the location of the main challenge of the ninth episode of the Canadian-American animated television series Total Drama Presents: The Ridonculous Race, where contestants were tasked to either return a serve from a tennis robot on the hotel's helipad, or squeegee an entire column of the hotel's windows.

See also 

 W Barcelona (Hotel Vela) – skyscraper of similar appearance in Barcelona, Spain (sail)
 Oman TiT – residential skyscraper of similar appearance in Taipei, Taiwan (sail)
 Elite Plaza – a similar-shaped skyscraper in Yerevan, Armenia
 JW Marriott Panama (Panama City) – similar structure
 Spinnaker Tower, Portsmouth – similar structure in Portsmouth, UK
 Vasco da Gama Tower – a skyscraper of similar appearance in Lisbon, Portugal (sail)
 Sail Tower – a skyscraper of similar appearance in Haifa, Israel (sail)
 List of tallest buildings in the United Arab Emirates
 List of buildings in Dubai
 List of tallest buildings in Dubai

References

Further reading

External links 

 

1999 establishments in the United Arab Emirates
Artificial islands of Dubai
Futurist architecture
High-tech architecture
Hotel buildings completed in 1999
Postmodern architecture in Dubai
Skyscraper hotels in Dubai